Helen Henderson Chain (July 31, 1849 – October 10, 1892) was an American artist and mountaineer. The majority of her work focused on landscapes in the American West. She has been called the first resident female artist in Colorado.

Early life 
Helen Henderson was born to George Henry Porter and Sarah Maria (Bacon) Henderson in Indianapolis, Indiana in 1849. The family moved to Antioch, California, when Helen was young. When Helen's mother died in 1862, she moved back to Indianapolis to reside with an aunt. Helen stayed in the Midwest through her formal education, attending Methodist College and graduating from Illinois Female College (present-day MacMurry College) in 1869. She received some formal art training as a part of her education. She married James Albert Chain in 1871, and the couple moved to Colorado.

Life in Colorado 

In Denver, James Chain established a book and stationery store that also sold art supplies. Helen used part of the space as her studio and also taught art students, including famous Rocky Mountain landscape painter Charles Partridge Adams. She continued to study art as well. Among her mentors were Hamilton Hamilton and Hudson River School painter George Inness. Chain was inspired by the outdoors and preferred to do her sketches on location, which often meant climbing mountains, such as Pikes Peak, Grey's Peak, and Long's Peak. She was the first woman to climb the Mount of the Holy Cross, which she did in 1877.

The Chains traveled throughout the West, including trips to Arizona, New Mexico, and California and famous landmarks like the Grand Canyon, Yosemite, and Yellowstone. Chain is reported to be the first woman to have painted the Grand Canyon. On these trips they were accompanied by famous artists such as Thomas Moran and William Henry Jackson. Chain was the first woman to exhibit at New York's National Academy of Design, where two of her paintings of New Mexico Pueblos were shown in 1882. Margaret Tobin Brown owned one of her works, which can be seen at the Molly Brown House Museum today.

Chain was also noted for being a humanitarian. After anti-Chinese riots in Denver in 1880, she began to use the storefront of the Chains' bookstore to teach English to Chinese immigrants.

Death 
The Chains embarked on a global tour in March 1892. While in Japan, Chain sent home art in Japanese style back to the Denver Fortnightly Club. On October 10, 1892, they were crossing the South China Sea between Shanghai and Hong Kong when their steamship sank during a typhoon. The Chains both drowned, along with the other passengers on board their ship, SS Bokhara.

Works

Select paintings 
The following paintings are listed in Kovinick and Yoshiki-Kovinick:

 Burros on the Trail

 Pikes Peak

 Twin Lakes near Leadville

 Royal Gorge on the Arkansas River

 Sierra Blanca

 Source of the Platte

 Rapid Transit

 New Mexico

 Struck It Rich

 Camping in the Rocky Mountains

 Santa Clara Plaza

 Pueblo de Taos

 Morning in the Pueblo Indian Village

 Mount of the Holy Cross (1879)

Other works 

 Snow-Shoe Itinerant by John L. Dyer (1891), (illustrator)

Exhibitions 

 National Mining Exhibition (1883) - Denver, CO

 National Academy of Design (1882) - New York City, NY

 Denver Paint and Clay Show (1889) - Denver, CO

 Denver Art League (1892) - Denver, CO

 Minneapolis Industrial Exposition (1892) - Minneapolis, MN

References

Further reading 
 Helen Henderson Chain: art & adventure in early Colorado by Deborah A. Wadsworth. Denver, Colorado : Denver Public Library, 2014.

External links

Artists from Colorado
1849 births
1892 deaths
19th-century American painters
American women painters